Krishawn Hogan (born May 12, 1995) is an American football wide receiver who currently a free agent. He played college football at Marian University.

High school career 
Hogan did not earn any playing time for Warren Central High School football during his first three years on the team. Hogan saw the field as a backup wide receiver during his senior year, logging 20 receptions and a touchdown during the season.

College career 
Division II school Walsh University signed Hogan after joining his cousin there on a recruiting trip. Hogan eventually left the team, joining NAIA program Marian University some time after. In three seasons at Marian, Hogan earned 263 receptions and 4,395 yards receiving, both school records. In addition, Hogan totaled 67 total all-purpose touchdowns. Hogan earned many honors throughout his stay at Marian, making Mideast League first-team three times, earning first-team All-American honors by the American Football Coaches Association and conference offensive player of the year.

Professional career 
Upon capturing the attention of multiple NFL scouts during his college career, Hogan was the first ever player from Marian University to earn an NFL Combine invite. There, he tested as a 79th percentile athlete according to Nike's SPARQ metric.

Arizona Cardinals
After receiving contract offers from several teams as an undrafted free agent, Hogan agreed to join the Arizona Cardinals on April 29, 2017. Hogan reportedly performed impressively during his first mini-camp practices, though he earned reprimands from head coach Bruce Arians for multiple offside penalties. He was waived on September 2, 2017.

Indianapolis Colts
On September 4, 2017, Hogan was signed to the Indianapolis Colts' practice squad. He was promoted to the active roster on September 26, 2017. He was placed on injured reserve on October 9, 2017 after suffering a torn ACL in Week 5.

On September 1, 2018, Hogan was waived/injured by the Colts and was placed on injured reserve. He was released on September 8, 2018. He was re-signed to the practice squad on October 19, 2018. He signed a reserve/future contract on January 13, 2019.

On August 31, 2019, Hogan was waived by the Colts.

New Orleans Saints
On September 18, 2019, Hogan was signed to the New Orleans Saints. He was promoted to the active roster on October 26, 2019. He made his first professional catch on a four-yard reception in Week 16 against the Tennessee Titans. He was placed on injured reserve on December 25, 2019, with a hamstring injury. He was waived on August 2, 2020.

Hogan had a tryout with the Detroit Lions on August 14, 2020.

Tennessee Titans
Hogan signed with the Tennessee Titans on August 19, 2020. He was waived on September 5, 2020.

Indianapolis Colts (second stint)
On September 30, 2020, Hogan was signed to the Indianapolis Colts practice squad. He was released on October 6.

Arizona Cardinals (second stint)
On December 23, 2020, Hogan signed with the practice squad of the Arizona Cardinals. He signed a reserve/future contract on January 5, 2021. He was waived/injured on June 3, 2021, and subsequently reverted to the team's injured reserve list the next day. He was waived from injured reserve on June 21.

Carolina Panthers
On July 28, 2021, Hogan signed a one-year deal with the Carolina Panthers. He was waived on August 23, 2021.

Montreal Alouettes
Hogan signed with the Montreal Alouettes of the Canadian Football League on January 25, 2022. He was released on June 4, 2022.

Career statistics

Personal life 
After departing Walsh University and before joining Marian University, Hogan worked as a janitor. He is the father of one child.

References
 and

External links
Marian Knights bio

1995 births
Living people
Players of American football from Indianapolis
American football wide receivers
Marian Knights football players
Arizona Cardinals players
Indianapolis Colts players
New Orleans Saints players
Tennessee Titans players
Carolina Panthers players